The Siswa is a river and valley in the Sankhuwasawa District. It is a tributary of the Arun.

References

Rivers of Koshi Province